Thomas Luke Mably is an English actor.

Early life
Mably was born in London, England. He attended the Birmingham School of Speech and Drama.

Career
Mably portrayed White in the thriller Exam under the direction of Stuart Hazeldine.  He had a lead role in the 2010 supernatural drama television series The Gates. He also played Prince Edvard in The Prince & Me.

In 2011, Mably portrayed alcoholic civilian neurosurgeon Dr. Simon Hill on the Global Canadian-British medical drama, Combat Hospital.

Filmography

Television

References

External links

Luke Mably on United Agents

1976 births
Alumni of Birmingham School of Acting
English male film actors
English male soap opera actors
Living people
20th-century English male actors
21st-century English male actors